The Texas A&M Aggies women's basketball team represents Texas A&M University (TAMU) in NCAA Division I women's basketball. The team is coached by Joni Taylor, entering her first season; she replaced Gary Blair, who retired after 37 years as a collegiate head coach, 19 of which were with TAMU. The Aggies play home games at Reed Arena, a 12,989-capacity arena in College Station, Texas on the campus of Texas A&M.

The Aggies were the 2011 NCAA Division I national champions. They beat the Notre Dame Fighting Irish 76–70. They have appeared in the NCAA tournament 15 times and garnered five conference championships.

History

Women's basketball at Texas A&M debuted in the 1974–75 season.  The program had not reached the postseason tournament until 1994, when it went to the Sweet Sixteen of the NCAA tournament.  In 1995, they won the WNIT championship.  In 1996, they were the SWC Champions and went to the First Round of the NCAA tournament.  Since then, the team had not achieved much notable postseason success until the hiring of Gary Blair before the 2003–04 season.  In the 2004–05 season, Blair took his team to the WNIT quarterfinals.  In the 2005–06 season, the team advanced to the NCAA first round.  In the 2006–07 season, the team won the Big 12 regular season championship, and advanced to the NCAA second round.  The 2007–08 team finished 8th in the AP Poll, the highest in team history.  It also received the highest seed in the NCAA tournament out of all five appearances, and finished in the Elite Eight. On March 29, 2011, Texas A&M defeated Baylor to advance to the program's first ever Final Four appearance.

At the Final Four, the Aggies defeated Stanford 63–62 and Notre Dame 76–70 to win their first national championship. Gary Blair became the first male coach other than Connecticut's Geno Auriemma to win a women's basketball national championship since Leon Barmore led Louisiana Tech to the 1988 championship.

Notable former players

Player awards

National Awards
NCAA basketball tournament Most Outstanding Player
Danielle Adams – 2011

2021–22 roster

Season-by-season results

† 1982: Inaugural year of NCAA tournament; final year for AIAW tournament
‡ A&M starts Southwest Conference play 

# A&M leaves SWC; starts Big 12 play.

* A&M leaves Big 12; starts Southeastern Conference play.

NCAA tournament results

See also
Texas A&M Aggies men's basketball

References

External links